Regions of the Czech Republic (plural: kraje) are higher-level territorial self-governing units of the Czech Republic. Every region is governed by a regional council, headed by a governor (hejtman). Elections to regional councils take place every four years.

According to the Act no. 129/2000 Coll. ("Law on Regions"), which implements Chapter VII of the Czech Constitution, the Czech Republic is divided into thirteen regions and one capital city with regional status as of 1 January 2000.

History
The first kraje were created in the Kingdom of Bohemia during the reign of Charles IV in the 14th century and they lasted till 1862/68. Kraje were reintroduced in 1949 in Czechoslovakia and still exist today (except for the early 1990s) in its successor states despite many rearrangements.

Competences

Rights and obligations of the regions include:
Establishment of secondary schools;
Responsibility for hospitals and social facilities;
Construction and repair of second and third class roads;
Organization of integrated transport systems;
Ordering of public intermunicipal transport;
Protection of the nature;
Cooperation in the distribution of EU funds within the NUTS-2 regions;
Tasks within the integrated rescue system;
Right to propose laws to the Chamber of Deputies and submit complaints to the Constitutional Court.

List of regions

Coats of arms

See also
Administrative divisions of Czechoslovakia
Districts of the Czech Republic
List of Czech regions by GDP
List of Czech regions by Human Development Index
ISO 3166-2:CZ
NUTS:CZ
Královec Region

References

 
Subdivisions of the Czech Republic
Regions
Czech Republic 1
Regions, Czech Republic